The Uzushio-class submarine (Whirlpools) was a series of submarines in service with Japanese Maritime Self Defense Force which was the first generation of the teardrop type submarine that valued the underwater performance against that of the conventional-hull type . Seven from 1967 fiscal year were built with the third defense plan. The eighth 49 fiscal year warship was discontinued and construction was discontinued because of the construction expense and sudden rise oil crisis though eight were planned at first. Many were converted to training submarines (ATSS) towards the end of their lives.

General characteristics
The Uzushio-class submarine adopted the teardrop hull type for the first time in the Maritime Self-Defense Force. However, the Maritime Self-Defense Force at that time selected the conventional model that valued safety from the operation results. It was moving to the warship type that valued the underwater performance, and the examination that used the model in 1960 fiscal year was advanced, and necessary data was obtained also with TRDI in the age.

Boats

Submarine classes